Midlands 5 East (South) was an level 10 English Rugby Union league and level 5 of the Midlands League, made up of teams from the southern part of the East Midlands region including clubs from Bedfordshire, Leicestershire, Northamptonshire and the occasional side from Cambridgeshire, all of whom played home and away matches throughout the season. 

It was formed in 2006 as Midlands 6 East (South), changing name to Midlands 5 East (South) in 2009 following league restructuring.  Promoted teams typically moving up to Midlands 4 East (South) (formerly Midlands 5 East (South)) and, as one of the lowest divisions in the Midlands league, there was no relegation. Dwindling numbers of teams from year to year meant that the league was abolished at the end of the 2009-10 season with all teams being transferred into Midlands 4 East (South).

Teams 2008–09
Aylestone Athletic
Biggleswade 
Kempston
Oadby Wyggestonians 
Oundle 
Queens
Rushden & Higham
Stockwood Park
Stoneygate
Wellingborough O.G

Teams 2007–08
Aylestone Athletic
Biggleswade 
Deepings
Market Harborough 
Oundle 
Queens
Rushden & Higham
Stamford Park
Stoneygate
St Ives (Midlands)

Original teams

When this division was introduced in 2006 as Midlands 6 East (South) it contained the following teams:

Anstey – relegated from Notts, Lincs & Derbyshire/North Leicestershire (12th)
Aylestone Athletic – transferred from East Midlands/South Leicestershire 2 (4th)
Aylestonians – transferred from East Midlands/South Leicestershire 2 (5th)
Deepings – transferred from East Midlands/South Leicestershire 2 (6th)
March Bears – transferred from East Midlands/South Leicestershire 2 (8th)
St Neots – transferred from East Midlands/South Leicestershire 2 (3rd)
Stamford College Old Boys - transferred from Nottinghamshire/Lincolnshire (8th)
Thorney – transferred from East Midlands/South Leicestershire 2 (7th)

Midlands 5 East (South) honours

Midlands 6 East (South) (2006–2009)

Originally known as Midlands 6 East (South), it was a tier 10 league along with its counterparts Midlands 6 East (North-East) and Midlands 6 East (North-West), which were introduced at tier 10 to replace the discontinued East Midlands/South Leicestershire 2, Derbyshire/North Leicestershire, Nottinghamshire/Lincolnshire leagues.  Promotion was to Midlands 5 East (South) and there was no relegation.

Midlands 5 East (South) (2009–2010)

League restructuring saw Midlands 6 East (South) renamed as Midlands 5 East (South), remaining a tier 10 league along with counterparts Midlands 5 East (North-East) and Midlands 5 East (North-West).  Promotion was now to Midlands 4 East (South) (formerly the old Midlands 5 East (South)) and there was no relegation.  The league was discontinued at the end of the 2009–10 season.

Number of league titles

Deepings (1)
Kempston (1)
St Ives (Midlands) (1)
St Neots (1)

Notes

See also
East Midlands RFU
Leicestershire RFU
English rugby union system
Rugby union in England

References

6
Rugby union in Bedfordshire
Rugby union in Northamptonshire
Rugby union in Leicestershire